Michael S. McLean is a retired director, editor and producer on movies and TV shows such as Stargate SG-1, Freebie and the Bean, Vega$, and he won an Emmy for Eleanor and Franklin: The White House Years.

He was born on December 27, 1942, in Cambridge, Massachusetts. He has two children, and is currently retired.

References

External links

Living people
American film directors
American film producers
American film editors
1942 births